Hashavat Aveda is one of 613 commandments (mitzvah) in the Jewish law that requires the return of loss to its owner.
In this mitzvah the originator is obligated as long as the loss is with him even if the owner has despaired of the loss, and as long as he does not want to return the loss he cancels a mitzvah he has done.

Apart from the "positive commandment", to return the item, there is a "negative commandment", which forbids one from ignoring the lost item that was found. Whoever takes an item without the intention of returning it, also transgresses this prohibition

The source of the mitzvah
This mitzvah includes the mitzvah of do's and don'ts, which are learned from Torah verses. The source of the 'commandment made' is mentioned in Parashat Mishpatim: "If you come across your enemy’s ox or donkey wandering off, be sure to return it"

The commandment "thou shalt not do" was written in the parshat Ki Teitzei: "If you see your brother's ox or sheep straying, do not ignore it but be sure to take it back to him. 2 If the brother does not live near you or if you do not know who he is, take it home with you and keep it until he comes looking for it. Then give it back to him. 3 Do the same if you find your brother's donkey or his cloak or anything he loses. Do not ignore it"()

According to Maimonides, during the mitzvah Hakhel a large part of the Book of Deuteronomy was read, including the verses that teach about the mitzvah "Hashavat Aveda".

Hashavat Aveda in the laws of the State of Israel
The State of Israel has a "Lost Sabbath" law that was enacted in 1973 and it regulates the treatment of losses. Like the law in the Torah, it refers to the two stages: first, what the origin must do in the loss, and second, when the loss becomes the property of the origin.

Contrary to Torah law, the law does not forbid the origin to ignore the loss. Only if the origin holds a loss, the law applies to it and obliges it to return it to its owner, give notice of the find to the police and hand it over to her if she demanded it of him.

Similar to Hebrew law, the originator is allowed to sell the lost property (after notifying the police) when the lost property may be damaged or lost in value, or the costs of maintaining it are unreasonable.

Similar to Hebrew law, there is no obligation to try to return a loss to its owner or to inform the police if the value of the loss is small and it must be assumed that due to the low value the owner despaired of it.

After four months, the law regards the original owner as having despaired of the loss and it becomes the property of the originator. In the first year after the origin acquires the ownership, the original (losing) owner can demand to redeem the loss, i.e. buy it from the origin, and the origin will have to sell it to him.

References

External links 
How Far Do I Need to Go to Return a Lost Object? in Chabad website

Positive Mitzvoth
Jewish courts and civil law